Arthur Rinderknech was the defending champion but chose not to defend his title.

Dominik Koepfer won the title after defeating Aleksandar Vukic 6–2, 6–4 in the final.

Seeds

Draw

Finals

Top half

Bottom half

References

External links
Main draw
Qualifying draw

Calgary National Bank Challenger - 1